Fung Chi-kin (born 9 June 1949, Hong Kong) is a Hong Kong politician. He was a member of the Legislative Council of Hong Kong for Financial Services in 1998 and 2000, substituting for Chim Pui-chung who was jailed for conspiring to forge documents and was impeached and disqualified as a legislator by Legco.

References
 Member of the Legislative Council − Hon FUNG Chi-kin

1949 births
Living people
HK LegCo Members 1998–2000
Hong Kong Progressive Alliance politicians
Democratic Alliance for the Betterment and Progress of Hong Kong politicians
Members of the Selection Committee of Hong Kong
Members of the Election Committee of Hong Kong, 2012–2017